The 2004 Castle Point Borough Council election took place on 10 June 2004 to elect members of Castle Point Borough Council in Essex, England. One third of the council was up for election and the Conservative party stayed in overall control of the council.

After the election, the composition of the council was
Conservative 35
Canvey Island Independent Party 6

Background
Before the election the Conservatives controlled the council with 39 councillors, while both Labour and the Canvey Island Independent Party had 1 seat. The Canvey Island Independent Party had been formed by ex-Labour councillor Dave Blackwell after he quit Labour in January 2004. The party wanted Canvey Island to have its own council and police division.

Election result
The Conservatives remained in control of the council, but lost 4 seats to the Canvey Island Independent Party. This reduced the Conservatives to 35 councillors, while the Canvey Island Independent Party became the only opposition on the council with 6 seats. The Canvey Island Independent Party won all 5 seats they had contested including defeating the only Labour councillor Terry Blackwell.

Ward results

By-elections between 2004 and 2006

Boyce

Canvey Island North

References

Castle Point Borough Council elections
2004 English local elections
2000s in Essex